The Tuxtla Gutiérrez Mexico Temple is the 75th operating temple of the Church of Jesus Christ of Latter-day Saints (LDS Church). Tuxtla Gutiérrez is the capital of Chiapas, Mexico's southernmost state and is an area famous for its many archaeological ruins. The city itself lies in a valley among the mountains. In April 1998, LDS Church president Gordon B. Hinckley announced the church would build thirty-two smaller temples around the world before the end of 2000. The Tuxtla Gutiérrez Mexico Temple is one of these small temples and was welcomed by the many local church members. Because of the mountainous terrain, travel in and out of the area is difficult and the closest LDS temple for members was in Mexico City — a 20-hour drive. The temple in Tuxtla Gutiérrez serves more than 18,000 members in southeastern Mexico.

History
James E. Faust, Second Counselor in the church's First Presidency, dedicated the Tuxtla Gutiérrez Mexico Temple on March 12, 2000 with more than 3,300 members attending the four dedicatory sessions. The Tuxtla Gutiérrez Mexico Temple sits on  next to a meetinghouse. The exterior is finished with white marble and features a single-spire design with a gold statue of the angel Moroni on top.

In 2020, like all the church's other temples, the Tuxtla Gutiérrez Mexico Temple was closed due to the COVID-19 pandemic.

See also

 Comparison of temples of The Church of Jesus Christ of Latter-day Saints
 List of temples of The Church of Jesus Christ of Latter-day Saints
 List of temples of The Church of Jesus Christ of Latter-day Saints by geographic region
 Temple architecture (Latter-day Saints)
 The Church of Jesus Christ of Latter-day Saints in Mexico

References

Additional reading

External links
Tuxtla Gutiérrez Mexico Temple Official site
Tuxtla Gutiérrez Mexico Temple at ChurchofJesusChristTemples.org

20th-century Latter Day Saint temples
Buildings and structures in Chiapas
Temples (LDS Church) completed in 2000
Temples (LDS Church) in Mexico
2000 establishments in Mexico
Tuxtla Gutiérrez